Ring of Fire is a 2013 American Biographical drama television film directed by Allison Anders and written by Richard Friedenberg. The film is about the life of June Carter Cash and Johnny Cash, and is based on their son John Carter Cash's 2007 book Anchored in Love: An Intimate Portrait of June Carter Cash. It stars Jewel Kilcher as June Carter Cash and Matt Ross as Johnny Cash. It aired on Lifetime on May 27, 2013, and was nominated for four Primetime Emmys in 2013, including Outstanding Directing for a Miniseries, Movie or a Dramatic Special.

Plot 
This is the story of the decades-long love affair between June Carter and her husband, Johnny Cash, a love that was stretched to the breaking point by Johnny's addiction to pills.

Cast
 Jewel as June Carter Cash
 Matt Ross as Johnny Cash
 John Doe as A. P. Carter
 Frances Conroy as Maybelle Carter
 Austin M. Stack as John Carter Cash
 Wilbur Fitzgerald as Garreth Connor
 Mary Stewart Sullivan as young June Carter

Accolades

References

External links
 

2013 television films
2013 films
2013 biographical drama films
2010s American films
2010s English-language films
American biographical drama films
American drama television films
Biographical films about musicians
Biographical television films
Country music films
Cultural depictions of Johnny Cash
Films based on biographies
Films directed by Allison Anders
Films scored by Anton Sanko
Lifetime (TV network) films
Television films based on books